The New York Film Critics Online Award for Best Director is an award given annually by the New York Film Critics Online. It was first introduced in 2001.

Winners

2000s

2010s

Multiple winners
2 wins
 Kathryn Bigelow (2009, 2012)
 Alfonso Cuarón (2013, 2018)
 Martin Scorsese (2002, 2004)

See also
 Los Angeles Film Critics Association Award for Best Director
 National Board of Review Award for Best Director
 New York Film Critics Circle Award for Best Director
 National Society of Film Critics Award for Best Director

External links
 www.nyfco.net

References

Film directing awards
Awards established in 2001